Pinwatta is a coastal town in Sri Lanka.  It lies in Western Province.

Transport 

It is served by a railway station on the Sri Lanka Railways.

See also 

 Transport in Sri Lanka
 Railway stations in Sri Lanka

References 

Populated places in Western Province, Sri Lanka